

A
René Abjean (born 1937)
Georges Arnoux (1891–1972)
Louis Aubert (1877–1968)

B
Paul Bastide (1879–1962)
François Benoist (1794–1878)
Eugène Bigot (1888–1965)
Louis-Albert Bourgault-Ducoudray (1840–1910)

C
Jacques Collebaut (Jacquet of Mantua) (1483–1559)
Jean Cras (1879–1932)

D
 Charles Delioux (1825–1915)
 Maurice Duhamel (1884–1940)
 Émile Durand (1830–1903)

H
Lucien Haudebert (1877–1963)
Aristide Hignard (1822–1898)
Jean Huré (1877–1930)

L
Théodore Lack (1846–1921)
Paul Ladmirault (1877–1944)
Jean Langlais (1907–1991)
Paul Le Flem (1881–1984)
Jef Le Penven (1919–1967)

M
Victor Massé (1822–1884)
Léon Moreau (1870–1946)

R
Rhené-Baton (1879–1940)
Théodore Ritter (1840–1887)
Joseph Guy Ropartz (1864–1955)

S
Alice Sauvrezis (1866–1946)
Claude-Michel Schönberg (born 1944)
Gaston Serpette (1846–1904)
Alan Simon (born 1964)
Didier Squiban (born 1959)
Alan Stivell (born 1944)

V
Louis Vuillemin (1879–1929)

External links
 Website dedicated to Breton composers in French and Breton

Breton
Lists of French people by occupation
 Brittany
French music-related lists